Gong River or Gongshui is a river of China. It is part of the East China Sea basin as a headwater of the Gan River, which itself is a tributary of the Yangtze.

The Gong river flows in Jiangxi province and is the main tributary of the Gan river, itself a tributary of the Yangtze. Its main tributaries are the Tao and Ping rivers.

The river basin of the river extends between longitudes – and latitudes – N.

Climate 
The climate is of the humid subtropical climate type with rainfall concentrated in the summer (between April and September). Average annual precipitation is 1627 mm with an evaporation of 1550 mm and an average annual temperature of 18 °C. The watershed is mainly occupied by hills and small mountains. This is one of the regions of southern China most affected by erosion phenomena associated with human activities (destruction of forests, cultivation of soils and opening of mines and quarries).

See also
List of rivers in China

References 

Rivers of China
Tributaries of the Yangtze River